Leopoldo "Coach Leo" Balayon III is a Filipino college basketball coach in the United States. He currently serves as the head men's basketball coach and director of athletics and recreation at Stanton University in Garden Grove, California. He previously served in the same capacity at Bethesda University in Anaheim, California. Balayon is the first individual, born and raised, in the Philippines to become a college head men's basketball coach in the United States. Balayon is also the only head men's basketball coach in college basketball to lead a non-NCAA/NAIA program to two upset victories against an NCAA Division 1 opponent.

Career 
In 2009, Balayon became an assistant coach for the defunct Pacifica College of Moreno Valley, California. After two seasons at Pacifica, Balayon moved on to become an assistant coach with Caltech, a Division 3 program in Pasadena, California. In 2013, Balayon joined Bethesda University's athletic program and served as associate head coach for both the men and women's basketball teams, and was eventually promoted to head men's basketball coach in 2015.

While at Bethesda University, Balayon became the only head men's basketball coach in college hoops history to lead a non-NCAA/NAIA program to a victory against an NCAA Division 1 opponent twice. Both historic upsets came at the expense of Cal State Northridge of the Big West Conference.

References 

Filipino men's basketball coaches
Filipino expatriates in the United States
College men's basketball coaches in the United States
Year of birth missing (living people)
Living people